Avraham "Avi" Kornick (born 2 May 1983) is an Israeli actor and is famous as a protagonist of the Israeli television series Split and HaShminiya.

Biography
Kornick grew up in Ramat Aviv, a prestigious neighborhood in Tel Aviv, Israel, where he lived together with his Jewish parents. He attended Alliance High School in Tel Aviv. He began acting at the age of 14 and appeared in several TV advertisements. At 18 he planned to study at the New York University, however his mother suffered from cancer, so he stayed in Israel. She died when Kornick was 19 years old. After working for the army he took part in several theatre plays. One of these theatre plays was Black Box, which is based on the book by Amos Oz. Since 2005 he is playing the main character Avi Moskovich in HaShminiya who is a computer specialist. From 2009 to 2012 he played one of the main character in the Israeli television series Split.

Filmography

Film

Television

References

External links

Avi Kornick at Ishim (Israeli film data base)

1983 births
Israeli Jews
Living people
People from Tel Aviv
Israeli male television actors
21st-century Israeli male actors
Israeli people of Romanian-Jewish descent